Denise Voïta (1928–2008) was a Swiss painter, designer, lithographer, and tapestry designer.

Biography
Voïta was born on March 14, 1928, in Marsens, Switzerland. She studied at the Lausanne School of Fine Arts.

in 1962 and 1987 she participated in the International Biennial of Tapestry in Lausanne.

In 2002 Voïta was awarded the Grand Prix of the Fondation Vaudoise pour la Culture.

Voïta died on April 11, 2008, in Lausanne, Switzerland.

References

This article was initially translated from the German Wikipedia.

1928 births
2008 deaths
20th-century Swiss painters
21st-century Swiss painters
20th-century Swiss women artists
21st-century Swiss women artists
Swiss contemporary artists
Swiss women painters